Julio Felipe Montt Momberg (born 27 April 1926 − 16 September 2019) was a Chilean politician who served as minister of State under Patricio Aylwin's government (1994–2000).

References

External links
 BCN Profile

1926 births
2019 deaths
People from Osorno, Chile
Julio
Chilean people of Catalan descent
National Falange politicians
Christian Democratic Party (Chile) politicians
Deputies of the XLV Legislative Period of the National Congress of Chile
Deputies of the XLVII Legislative Period of the National Congress of Chile
Chilean philosophers
University of Chile alumni